"On What You're On" is the lead single by English pop rock band Busted from their third studio album, Night Driver (2016). It was written by the band and John Fields, and produced by Fields and co-produced by Alex Metric.

The single was first announced on 19 September when a short teaser trailer for the song was uploaded to the band's Twitter account. Similar short videos were used to generate hype in the lead up to the release of the single at midnight on 30 September (on iTunes and Spotify).

The song made its radio debut on the day of its release when the band was interviewed by Scott Mills during his show on BBC Radio 1. The music video was released the same day.

Musically, the song has been compared to Daft Punk and The 1975.

Charts

References

2016 singles
Busted (band) songs
Songs written by John Fields (record producer)
Songs written by James Bourne
Songs written by Charlie Simpson
Songs written by Matt Willis
Songs written by Lauren Christy
East West Records singles
2016 songs
Song recordings produced by John Fields (record producer)